Molla Baqer-e Olya (also Romanized as Mollā Bāqer-e ‘Olyā; also known as Mollā Bāqer) is a village in Hendudur Rural District, Sarband District, Shazand County, Markazi Province, Iran. At the 2006 census, its population was 134, in 44 families.

References 

Populated places in Shazand County